Surry may refer to:
 Surry, Maine, United States
 Surry, New Hampshire, United States
 Surry, Virginia, United States
 Surry County, North Carolina, United States
 Surry County, Virginia, United States
 Surry Nuclear Power Plant, near Newport News, Virginia
 Surry Hills, New South Wales, Australia
 Surry (1811 ship), the first convict ship to be quarantined in Australia
 Surry, neologism found in Laura Nyro's lyrics to "Stoned Soul Picnic"

People with the surname
 Cecil Surry (1907–1956), American cartoonist
 Steve Surry (born 1982), English professional golfer

See also
 Surrey (disambiguation)
 Suri (disambiguation)